Marcone Amaral Costa Jr. known as Marcone (born 5 April 1978) is a naturalized Qatari footballer. His name has also been misspelled as Marconi.

Biography

Brazil
Born in Poções, Bahia, Marcone started his career at state capital Salvador. He made his Série A debut in 1997 season, played 10 games. After played for the team at 1998 Copa do Brasil and 1998 Campeonato Baiano, he was signed by Italian club A.C. Venezia along with Bilica and Tácio, however at that time Italian Football Federation imposed a quota on how many non-EU player that a team to keep and field them, thus Marcone was loaned to Swiss side Bellinzona.

He then returned to Vitória and played in 1999 Copa do Brasil and 1999 Campeonato Baiano. He left the club before the start of 1999 Campeonato Brasileiro Série A. He returned to the team for Copa João Havelange. After played for the team at 2001 Copa do Brasil and 2001 Campeonato Baiano, he was transferred to Vila Nova of 2001 Campeonato Brasileiro Série B.

In 2003, he left for Estrela do Norte. After played for União Barbarense at 2004 Copa do Brasil and 2004 Campeonato Paulista, he left for Marília. He played 4 games in 2004 Campeonato Brasileiro Série B, all as substitutes.

Qatar
In July 2004 he left for Qatari side Al-Shamal. He then left for Al-Gharafa. He only played twice in 2010 AFC Champions League, on group stage match 6 and the succeeding round of 16 match.

In July 2011, it was announced on the QFA website that Marcone had left Al-Gharafa to join the recently promoted El Jaish.

Club career statistics
Statistics accurate as of 21 August 2011

1Includes Emir of Qatar Cup.
2Includes Sheikh Jassem Cup.
3Includes AFC Champions League.

International career
Marcone played for Qatar after lived for the county for more than 2 years (FIFA requirement). He played 9 games in 2010 FIFA World Cup qualification.

He was the captain of Qatar team at 2010 Asian Games as one of the three overage players.

International goals 
Scores and results list Qatar's goal tally first.

Honours
Regional
Campeonato do Nordeste: 1997, 1999
State
Copa Espírito Santo: 2003
Campeonato Baiano: 1997, 2000

References

External links 
 Player profile – QSL.com.qa
 Futpedia 
 CBF 
 CBF – Site Oficial da Seleção Brasileira de Futbol 
 
 

Qatari footballers
Qatar international footballers
Brazilian emigrants to Qatar
Brazilian footballers
Esporte Clube Vitória players
AC Bellinzona players
Vila Nova Futebol Clube players
Estrela do Norte Futebol Clube players
União Agrícola Barbarense Futebol Clube players
Marília Atlético Clube players
Al-Shamal SC players
Al-Gharafa SC players
Al-Rayyan SC players
Expatriate footballers in Switzerland
Naturalised citizens of Qatar
Association football central defenders
Sportspeople from Bahia
1978 births
Living people
El Jaish SC players
Qatar Stars League players
Al-Arabi SC (Qatar) players
Qatari people of Brazilian descent
Footballers at the 2010 Asian Games
Asian Games competitors for Qatar